Maureen  is a female given name. In Gaelic, it is Máirín, a pet form of Máire (the Irish cognate of Mary), which is derived from the Hebrew Miriam. The name has sometimes been regarded as corresponding to the male given name Maurice.

Some notable bearers of the name are:

People
 Maureen Anderman (born 1946), American actress 
 Dame Maureen Brennan (born 1954), British educator
 Maureen Connolly (1934–1969), American tennis player
 Maureen Dowd (born 1952), American journalist
 Maureen Drake (born 1971), Canadian tennis player
 Maureen Duffy (born 1933), British writer
 Maureen Fitzgerald Terry, American politician
 Maureen Forrester (1930–2010), Canadian opera singer
 Maureen Guy (1932–2015), Welsh mezzo-soprano singer
 Maureen Herman (born 1966), American rock musician
 Maureen Hingert (born 1937), Sri Lankan dancer, model, and actress 
 Maureen Hunter (born 1948), Canadian playwright
 Maureen Johnson (born 1973), American writer
 Dame Maureen Lipman (born 1946), British actress
 Maureen Louys (born 1978), Belgian television presenter
 Maureen Maher, American television reporter
 Maureen McCormick (born 1956), American actress
 Maureen McGovern (born 1949), American singer
Maureen Medved, Canadian playwright
 Maureen O'Boyle (born 1963), American television reporter and news anchor
 Maureen O'Hara (1920–2015), Irish actress
 Maureen O'Sullivan (1911–1998), American actress
 Maureen Phillips, Trinidadian cricketer
 Maureen Riscoe (1921-2003), British actress and casting director
 Maureen Stapleton (1925–2006), American actress
Maureen Starkey Tigrett (1946–1994), first wife of musician Ringo Starr
 Maureen Tucker (born 1944), American drummer
 Maureen Thelma Watson (1925–1994), Rhodesian politician
 Maureen Wroblewitz (born 1998), Filipino-German fashion model
 Maureen White, Canadian theatre actor, director, and playwright

Fictional characters
Maureen Bullock, a character in the British sitcom Please Sir!
Maureen Corley, a character in Full Throttle
Maureen Johnson, a character in the musical and film Rent
Maureen Johnson, a character in novels by Robert Heinlein
Maureen Robinson, mother of the Robinson family in Lost in Space
Maureen Connor, aka Permafrost, a character from Static Shock
Maureen Murphy, a character in the Netflix series F is for Family
Maureen Clinton, aka Mo, a character in the British children’s series Sooty & Co.

See also 
 Maureen (disambiguation)
 Maurine (disambiguation)

English feminine given names
Irish feminine given names